is any Shinto shrine in which Tokugawa Ieyasu (1543–1616) is enshrined. Ieyasu was the founder of the Tokugawa shogunate (1603–1868), which is the third and last of the shogunal governments in Japanese history. He was deified with the name , the "Great Gongen, Light of the East" (A Gongen is believed to be a buddha who has appeared on Earth in the form of a kami to save sentient beings), and this is what gives Tōshō-gū shrines their name.

Tōshō-gū shrines are found throughout Japan. The most well-known Tōshō-gū is the Nikkō Tōshō-gū is located in Nikkō, Tochigi Prefecture. It is one of Japan's most popular destinations for tourists and is part of Shrines and Temples of Nikkō UNESCO World Heritage Site. Ieyasu's son, the second shōgun Hidetada, ordered the construction of the Nikkō Tōshō-gū. Later, the third shōgun Iemitsu had the shrine greatly enlarged and lavishly decorated.

Ueno Tōshō-gū at Ueno Park in Tokyo is also widely known. The Kunōzan Tōshō-gū is in Shizuoka Prefecture and rivals Nikkō's for decorative splendor. Another one is the Nagoya Tōshō-gū, constructed in 1619. A Tōshō-gū can also be found at Miyanochō, in Sendai.

During the Edo period these shrines reached 500 in number, but after the Meiji Restoration many were abandoned, and others united with shrines in the area. Presently, it is estimated that there are about 130 Tōshō-gū. The National Tōshō-gū association lists a total of 48 shrines.

Gallery of Tōshō-gū shrines

See also 
List of Tōshō-gū
List of World Heritage Sites in Japan
Testament of Ieyasu

References

External links
Toshogu.net (in Japanese)
 National Archives of Japan:  Illustrations of Road to Nikko, Tempo 14 (1843)

 
Shinto shrines in Japan